The 1958 Estonian SSR Football Championship was won by Ülemiste Kalev.

League table

References

Estonian Football Championship
Est
Football